Film Resource Unit (FRU) is an independent film distributor from Johannesburg, South Africa.

FRU was founded in 1986. In course of the years it has become a worldwide distributor of African films. In South Africa proper it aims to win the hearts of the people for films of African origin.

Next to its function as a film distributor, Film Resource Unit has taken up a role for the society. For instance, during the years of apartheid it showed films that were forbidden by the white authorities. Furthermore, it effectuates an audience development project. With it, FRU shows films and gives workshops in areas where there is a lack of audio-visual media. In these cases subjects are chosen that have a certain value for the society, like domestic violence, HIV and aids.

The organization also set up Video Resource Centers where videos can be bought, rented and viewed. Furthermore, it introduced a marketing and film training program for unemployed South Africans, whose films are finally shown at film festivals the FRU organizes itself.

For the extensive development, from zero until a company that is active on a wide range of social development areas, Film Resource United was honored with a Prince Claus Award from the Netherlands in the year of 2000.

External links 
 
IMdB

References 

Culture of Johannesburg
Film distributors
Organisations based in Johannesburg